Adriaan Nijs (6 June 1683 – 21 April 1771) was a Flemish sculptor active in the Waasland.

He was educated in Antwerp, where he was a pupil of Hendrik Frans Verbruggen. At the end of his life he settled in Temse. His oeuvre is known for its pure Rococo carvings. 

He married Joanna Catharina Van der Beke, by whom he had two daughters and nine sons. One of his sons from this marriage, Philips Alexander, was also a sculptor and his son Frans a well-known goldsmith. He later remarried to Catharina Magdalena Wesemael.

He died in Temse in 1771.

Known works
 Collegekapel Sint-Niklaas: choir stalls
 Sint-Ludgeruskerk, Zele: confessionals, communion rail
 Sint-Petruskerk, Bazel: communion rail
 Church of Our Lady, Temse: spire, communion rails, pulpit, confessionals and choir stalls
 Sint-Niklaaskerk, Lochristi: communion rail and panelling
 Buggenhout, Sint-Niklaaskerk: pulpit
 Gruuthusemuseum, Brugge: sculptures

Gallery

References

1683 births
1771 deaths
17th-century Flemish sculptors
People from Antwerp